Gymnoscelis caelestis is a moth in the family Geometridae.

References

Moths described in 1988
Gymnoscelis